Lynette Cooper (born 14 March 1944) is a Rhodesian former swimmer. She competed in two events for Rhodesia at the 1960 Summer Olympics.

References

1944 births
Living people
Rhodesian female swimmers
Olympic swimmers of Rhodesia
Swimmers at the 1960 Summer Olympics
Sportspeople from Cape Town
South African emigrants to Rhodesia
White Rhodesian people